Rosenwald High School (formerly New Roads High School) was a school located on Louisiana Highway 10 in the city of New Roads, Louisiana, United States. It was opened in 1922 as New Roads Rosenwald Elementary School and was located on upper Cemetery Street.

It was as an all-black school that went up through the seventh grade, built with funding from the Rosenwald Foundation. In 1950, an all-black high school - New Roads High School - was opened in New Roads. This new school was the first high school for blacks in Pointe Coupee Parish. In 1958, the school was merged with Rosenwald Elementary School and was moved to the New Roads Street location. At this merger, the school was called New Roads Rosenwald High School.

The name was later changed to Rosenwald High School. In 1980, Rosenwald High was partnered with the mostly white Poydras High School as part of a desegregation plan similar to that involving Batchelor High School and Innis High School. After Poydras High closed in 1981, Rosenwald became the only public high school in New Roads, and the only magnet high school in the parish.

It was a high school in the Pointe Coupee Parish Public School system until after the 1990–91 school year, when the high school was closed down as part of a plan to combine all parish public schools into the newly formed Pointe Coupee Central High School. The school's mascots was the Trojans. It was named after the philanthropist, Julius Rosenwald. The school has origins in the Rosenwald Schools of the early 1900s. The old Rosenwald High School building, located at 1100 New Roads Street, is currently Rosenwald Elementary School.

References

Public high schools in Louisiana
Schools in Pointe Coupee Parish, Louisiana
Rosenwald schools
1922 establishments in Louisiana
Educational institutions disestablished in 1991
Magnet schools in Louisiana
Educational institutions established in 1922
Historically segregated African-American schools in Louisiana